Hadley Clare Freeman (born 15 May 1978) is an American British journalist based in London. She writes for The Sunday Times, having previously written for The Guardian.

Early life 
Freeman was born in New York City to a Jewish family. Her father worked in finance. The family moved to London when Freeman was 11. She has dual British and American citizenship.

Freeman suffered from anorexia and was treated in a psychiatric unit during six different periods between ages 13 and 17. After taking her A-level examinations while boarding at the Cambridge Centre for Sixth-form Studies, she read English literature at St Anne's College, Oxford and edited the student newspaper Cherwell.

Career 
After a year in Paris, Freeman worked on the fashion desk of The Guardian for eight years. She joined The Guardian in 2000 and has worked for the newspaper as a staff writer and columnist  and contributes to the UK version of Vogue. Following an article for The Guardian in July 2013 criticising misogynistic behaviour, Freeman received a bomb threat on Twitter.

Freeman's books include The Meaning of Sunglasses: A Guide to (Almost) All Things Fashionable, in 2009 and Be Awesome: Modern Life for Modern Ladies in 2013, which was described by Jennifer Lipman in The Jewish Chronicle as "a detailed attack on how women are both portrayed and conditioned to act in public life". Life Moves Pretty Fast appeared in 2015.

In March 2020, House of Glass: The Story and Secrets of a Twentieth-Century Jewish Family, was published. It is an account of the lives of her grandmother Sala Glass and her three brothers Alex, Jacques, and Henri in Poland, France, and the United States during the course of the twentieth century. Karen Heller wrote in The Washington Post of Freeman being "an exacting historian" who "tackles anti-Semitism, Jewish guilt and success".

Freeman ended her Weekend Guardian column in September 2021 after 5½ years to concentrate on interviews for the newspaper. A memoir recounting her teenage experience of anorexia is scheduled to be published by Fourth Estate in spring 2023.

In November 2022, Freeman announced that she would be leaving The Guardian and would write for The Sunday Times.

Views
In June 2018, Freeman denounced the treatment of undocumented child immigrants arriving in America, drawing parallels with her grandmother's experience of escaping from the Holocaust. Freeman described it as deliberate cruelty by the Trump administration, and a reflection of latent racism amongst its supporters.

In November 2018, U.S. journalists from The Guardian published an opinion piece criticising a Guardian editorial about the Gender Recognition Act, claiming it was transphobic. In tweets, Freeman defended the editorial. She has since been cited as expressing views that trans-allied feminists consider transphobic, particularly in regards to trans people seeking healthcare, and trans people struggling with suicidal ideation. In June 2021, Freeman used her regular opinion column in The Guardian to describe that she had "lost at least a dozen friends over this ... friends who have told me my beliefs are transphobic". She later said that there was an "atmosphere of real fear" at the paper over their coverage of trans issues, not allowing her and others to write on gender issues and barring her from interviewing J. K. Rowling and Martina Navratilova who have known views on transgender people. After 22 years of working for the Guardian she left the newspaper when she was refused permission to follow up on the controversy surrounding the trans charity Mermaids.

Personal life
Freeman often discusses cinema, particularly from the 1980s, in her articles and occasionally in broadcasts. She has said that her favourite film is Ghostbusters and that she has a collection of related books and articles.

She has twin sons and a daughter.

References

External links 

Column archive at The Guardian
Column archive at New Statesman

Article archive  at Journalisted.com

1978 births
Living people
Alumni of St Anne's College, Oxford
American emigrants to England
American women journalists
The Guardian journalists
The Sunday Times people
Jewish American journalists
People educated at the Cambridge Centre for Sixth-form Studies
21st-century American journalists
21st-century American women writers
British women journalists
21st-century British journalists
21st-century British women writers